Chipmunks are small, striped rodents of the family Sciuridae. Chipmunks are found in North America, with the exception of the Siberian chipmunk which is found primarily in Asia.

Taxonomy and systematics
Chipmunks may be classified either as a single genus, Tamias, or as three genera: Tamias, of which the eastern chipmunk (T. striatus) is the only living member; Eutamias, of which the Siberian chipmunk (E. sibiricus) is the only living member; and Neotamias, which includes the 23 remaining, mostly western North American, species. These classifications were treated as subgenera due to the chipmunks' morphological similarities.
As a result, most taxonomies over the twentieth century have placed the chipmunks into a single genus. However, studies of mitochondrial DNA show that the divergence between each of the three chipmunk groups is comparable to the genetic differences between Marmota and Spermophilus, so the three genera classifications have been adopted here.

The common name originally may have been spelled "chitmunk", from the native Odawa (Ottawa) word jidmoonh, meaning "red squirrel" (cf. Ojibwe  ajidamoo). The earliest form cited in the Oxford English Dictionary  is "chipmonk", from 1842. Other early forms include "chipmuck" and "chipminck", and in the 1830s they were also referred to as "chip squirrels", probably in reference to the sound they make. In the mid-19th century, John James Audubon and his sons included a lithograph of the chipmunk in their Viviparous Quadrupeds of North America, calling it the "chipping squirrel [or] hackee". Chipmunks have also been referred to as "striped squirrels", "timber tigers", "minibears", and "ground squirrels" (although the name "ground squirrel" may refer to other squirrels, such as those of the genus Spermophilus).

Diet

Chipmunks have an omnivorous diet primarily consisting of seeds, nuts and other fruits, and buds. They also commonly eat grass, shoots, and many other forms of plant matter, as well as fungi, insects and other arthropods, small frogs, worms, and bird eggs. They will also occasionally eat newly hatched baby birds. Around humans, chipmunks can eat cultivated grains and vegetables, and other plants from farms and gardens, so they are sometimes considered pests. Chipmunks mostly forage on the ground, but they climb trees to obtain nuts such as hazelnuts and acorns. At the beginning of autumn, many species of chipmunk begin to stockpile nonperishable foods for winter. They mostly cache their foods in a larder in their burrows and remain in their nests until spring, unlike some other species which make multiple small caches of food. Cheek pouches allow chipmunks to carry food items to their burrows for either storage or consumption.

Ecology and life history

Eastern chipmunks, the largest of the chipmunks, mate in early spring and again in early summer, producing litters of four or five young twice each year. Western chipmunks breed only once a year. The young emerge from the burrow after about six weeks and strike out on their own within the next two weeks.

These small mammals fulfill several important functions in forest ecosystems. Their activities harvesting and hoarding tree seeds play a crucial role in seedling establishment. They consume many different kinds of fungi, including those involved in symbiotic mycorrhizal associations with trees, and are an important vector for dispersal of the spores of subterranean sporocarps (truffles) which have co-evolved with these and other mycophagous mammals and thus lost the ability to disperse their spores through the air.

The sleeping quarters are kept clear of shells, and feces are stored in refuse tunnels.

The eastern chipmunk hibernates in the winter, while western chipmunks do not, relying on the stores in their burrows.

Chipmunks play an important role as prey for various predatory mammals and birds but are also opportunistic predators themselves, particularly with regard to bird eggs and nestlings, as in the case of eastern chipmunks and mountain bluebirds (Siala currucoides).

Chipmunks typically live about three years, although some have been observed living to nine years in captivity.

Chipmunks are diurnal. In captivity, they are said to sleep for an average of about 15 hours a day. It is thought that mammals which can sleep in hiding, such as rodents and bats, tend to sleep longer than those that must remain on alert.

Genera
Genus Eutamias
 Siberian chipmunk, Eutamias sibiricus

Genus Tamias
 Eastern chipmunk, Tamias striatus
 †Tamias aristus

Genus Neotamias
 Allen's chipmunk, Neotamias senex
 Alpine chipmunk, Neotamias alpinus
 Buller's chipmunk, Neotamias bulleri
 California chipmunk, Neotamias obscurus
 Cliff chipmunk, Neotamias dorsalis
 Colorado chipmunk, Neotamias quadrivittatus
 Durango chipmunk, Neotamias durangae
 Gray-collared chipmunk, Neotamias cinereicollis
 Gray-footed chipmunk, Neotamias canipes
 Hopi chipmunk,  Neotamias rufus
 Least chipmunk, Neotamias minimus
 Lodgepole chipmunk,  Neotamias speciosus
 Long-eared chipmunk, Neotamias quadrimaculatus
 Merriam's chipmunk, Neotamias merriami
 Palmer's chipmunk, Neotamias palmeri
 Panamint chipmunk, Neotamias panamintinus
 Red-tailed chipmunk,  Neotamias ruficaudus
 Siskiyou chipmunk,  Neotamias siskiyou
 Sonoma chipmunk,  Neotamias sonomae
 Townsend's chipmunk,  Neotamias townsendii
 Uinta chipmunk,  Neotamias umbrinus
 Yellow-cheeked chipmunk, Neotamias ochrogenys
 Yellow-pine chipmunk,  Neotamias amoenus

In popular culture 

 Alvin and the Chipmunks, an animated virtual band
 Chip 'n' Dale, cartoon Disney chipmunks

References

Further reading
 Baack, Jessica K. and Paul V. Switzer. "Alarm Calls Affect Foraging Behavior in Eastern Chipmunks (Tamias Striatus, Rodentia: Sciuridae)." Ethology. Vol. 106. Dec. 2003. 1057–1066.
 Gordon, Kenneth Llewellyn. The Natural History and Behavior of the Western Chipmunk and the Mantled Ground Squirrel. Oregon: 1943

External links

 

 
Articles containing video clips
Extant Miocene first appearances
Mammal common names
Taxa named by Johann Karl Wilhelm Illiger